Stipitatic acid is a tropolone derivative isolated from Talaromyces stipitatus (Penicillium stipitatum).

References

Tropolones
Tropones
Aromatic compounds